Northern Ireland Water Limited (Ulster-Scots: Norlin Airlan Wattèr) is the main water company in Northern Ireland.

Formerly an executive agency within Northern Ireland Executive, it became a government-owned company on 1 April 2007. The company now sits as an Agency within the Department of Infrastructure (DfI). The company provides 575 million litres of clean water a day for almost 1.8 million people as well as treating 340 million litres of wastewater every day, and has approximately 1,300 staff. It is responsible for 27,000 km of watermains and 16,000 km of sewerage mains, as well as 23 water treatment works and 1,030 wastewater treatment works. It cost around £460m each year to deliver water services across Northern Ireland.

History
Prior to 1973, water and sewerage services in Northern Ireland outside Belfast were the responsibility of local councils. Within the capital, the Belfast City and District Water Commissioners were responsible. In 1974, responsibility for providing these services was transferred to the Department of the Environment. Within the Department, a new Water Executive was responsible for the management and administration of water and sewerage services.

Whilst water and sewer companies were privatised in England and Wales in 1989, these services remained public in Northern Ireland.

In 1996, the Water Executive became an executive agency and was rebranded as the Northern Ireland Water Service and, in 1999, responsibility for water transferred to the Department for Regional Development.

For decades domestic water and sewer services in Northern Ireland have been provided without charges to customers. Only non-residential customers received water bills and had water meters. However, in December 2002 it was announced that Northern Ireland's water and sewerage services would become self-financing. This was followed by two years of extensive consultations on water reforms, with the aim of introducing meters for new houses as well as water and sewer charges for all domestic customers. The announcement of the establishment of a state-owned company was made by Minister of State John Spellar in August 2004. The water charges plan was included in the Water and Sewerage Services (Northern Ireland) Order 2006, introduced by then secretary of state Peter Hain. In parallel, Northern Ireland Water Limited was created in April 2007. An anti-water charges campaign in 2007 resulted in the plans for water charges to be abandoned. Later, all major parties in Northern Ireland claimed to have had a leading role in the anti-water charges movement.

In 2007 a system of economic regulation had been set up similar to the existing system in England and Wales where Ofwat regulates the water sector. The Northern Ireland Authority for Utility Regulation was appointed to carry out this role. Performance benchmarking by the regulator showed that there was a "performance gap" with England and Wales concerning drinking water quality, wastewater quality, leakage, customer service and efficiency. This gap has now been more than halved. April 2017 marked the Company's first 10 years, in 2016/17 the Company reported record levels of wastewater compliance, with water quality compliance remaining a near record levels.

Structure
NI Water is a Government Owned Company (GoCo) – which is a statutory trading body owned by central government but operating under company legislation. This means that the Company's corporate governance structure and compliance is with the Companies Act 2006 and the principles of good corporate governance as set out in the UK Corporate Governance Code, where appropriate.

Major reservoirs and treatment works

Silent Valley Reservoir
Lough Neagh
Ben Crom Reservoir
Spelga Dam and Reservoir
Dunore Point
Drumaroad Water Treatment Works, built as part of the Aquarius Mourne Water Project

See also

List of Government departments and agencies in Northern Ireland

References

External links
Official Website

1999 establishments in Northern Ireland
Utilities of the United Kingdom
Northern Ireland coast and countryside
Government-owned companies of Northern Ireland
Water supply and sanitation in Northern Ireland